KBMS (1480 AM) is a radio station broadcasting an urban adult contemporary format. Licensed to Vancouver, Washington, United States, it serves the Portland, Oregon area.  The studios are in Vancouver, while the transmitter site is in North Portland at the Smith and Bybee Refuge.

On February 2, 1956, 1480 AM began operations as KRIV in Camas, Washington.  On December 30, 1961 the transmitter and additional studio were moved from 1916 N.E. 2nd Ave., in Camas, to 12640 N. Farr Rd. on Hayden Island, Oregon. The location was in the N.W. corner parking area at "Jantzen Beach Amusement Park", which today is about where "Video Only" is at 1860 N. Hayden Island Dr. The studio was in a small building which stood a few feet above ground.

The station is currently owned by the Seattle Medium. KBMS is known in Portland's African-American community. KBMS is the only Urban AC station in the Pacific Northwest.

KBMS carries the Tom Joyner Morning Show, "Keeping it Real" with The Reverend Al Sharpton, as well as "Trending Today" with Carl Nelson.

External links

FCC History Cards for KBMS

BMS
Urban adult contemporary radio stations in the United States
Radio stations established in 1967